Thokarpa is a village in Sindhupalchok District in the Bagmati Zone of central Nepal. At the time of the 2013 Nepal census it had a population of 6,243 and had 
1,047 houses in it.

References

thokarpa ward no 1 mirre

Popular Villages in Thokarpa 
Thokarpa is a village development committee with many sattlements. Gairigaun, Guthigaun, Kotgaun, Bhalukharka, Jamune, Tinghare, Dandakateri, Mulkharka, Chinde, Gaire, Ghartigaun, Mane, Bhanjyang,Titre, Simle, Kafle, Laharetol, etc. are the popular villages.

Newly,after starting the Chehere Thokarpa road. 12 Kilo became a hub of some village of Kavrepalanchok district and eastern settlements of 
Thokarpa VDC.Today there is road from sukute to different part of this village.

Populated places in Sindhupalchowk District